Mycodrosophila is a genus of vinegar flies, insects in the family Drosophilidae. There are at least 120 described species in Mycodrosophila.

See also
 List of Mycodrosophila species

References

Further reading

External links

 

Drosophilidae genera
Articles created by Qbugbot